Samuel Gervacio (born January 10, 1985, in Sabana de la Mar, Dominican Republic) is a professional baseball pitcher who is a free agent. He is known for his unusual windup.

Career

Houston Astros
Gervacio was originally signed as an undrafted free agent by the Houston Astros on December 3, 2002. Gervacio had a 3–2 record with a 2.67 ERA for Greeneville and led the team in games pitched (21), saves (8), and was tied for second in strikeouts with 53. Gervacio also made 5 relief appearances for the Legends, getting one win with an 0.96 ERA.

In , Gervacio played for the Legends again, this time for an entire season. With a 7–5 record and a 2.47 ERA, he led the team in games pitched (47) and saves (10). In , Gervacio began the season for the Single-A Salem Avalanche. He had a 1–3 record with a 2.44 ERA and led the team with 18 saves. On August 5, Gervacio was promoted to the Double-A Corpus Christi Hooks, where he finished the season. For the Hooks, he went 3–2 with a 1.99 ERA.

On November 20, 2007, the Astros purchased Gervacio's contract, protecting him from the Rule 5 Draft. On July 30, 2009, Gervacio was called up to the Houston Astros from Triple-A Round Rock after the Astros released Russ Ortiz.

Gervacio signed a one-year minor league contract with the Astros for the 2011 season, with an invitation to spring training.

Rieleros de Aguascalientes
He pitched for the Rieleros de Aguascalientes of the Mexican League in 2013, pitching a 5.35 ERA in 37 games.

Bridgeport Bluefish
He played for the Bridgeport Bluefish of the Atlantic League in 2015, after skipping the 2014 season. He pitched to a 4.33 ERA in 47 games with the Bluefish in 2015. He did considerably better in 2016, with a 1.98 ERA in 35 appearances.

Vallejo Admirals
In 2017, he played for the Vallejo Admirals of the Pacific Association, pitching to a 3.46 ERA in 36 appearances.

New Britain Bees
He signed with the New Britain Bees of the Atlantic League of Professional Baseball for the 2018 season, hurling 51 games with a 2.52 ERA. He became a free agent following the season.

He re-signed with the Bees for the 2019 season, and became a free agent after the season.

Road Warriors
On February 13, 2020, Gervacio signed with the Road Warriors of the Atlantic League of Professional Baseball. He did not play a game for the team because of the cancellation of the 2020 ALPB season due to the COVID-19 pandemic and became a free agent after the year.

References

External links

1985 births
Living people
Bridgeport Bluefish players
Corpus Christi Hooks players
Dominican Republic expatriate baseball players in Mexico
Dominican Republic expatriate baseball players in the United States
Greeneville Astros players
Houston Astros players
Lexington Legends players
Major League Baseball pitchers
Major League Baseball players from the Dominican Republic
Mexican League baseball pitchers
New Britain Bees players
Oklahoma City RedHawks players
Rieleros de Aguascalientes players
Round Rock Express players
Salem Avalanche players